Sports City Stadium "KSZO" in Ostrowiec Świętokrzyski (Polish: Miejski Stadion Sportowy "KSZO" w Ostrowcu Świętokrzyskim) is a football stadium in Ostrowiec Świętokrzyski, Poland. It is the home ground of KSZO Ostrowiec Świętokrzyski. The stadium holds 8,000 people.

Facts
 Total capacity: 7,430 (before renovation circa 12,000)
 Club: KSZO Ostrowiec Świętokrzyski
 Illumination: 1 411 lux 
 Record attendance: 13,000 (KSZO Ostrowiec Świętokrzyski - Lech Poznań 0-0, 9.08.1997 ) 
 Address: ul. Świętokrzyska 11, 27-400 Ostrowiec Świętokrzyski
 Other: covered, monitoring (14 cameras)

Main events

Matches of the national football team of Poland
15 March 1995:   Poland –  Lithuania 4:1 (3:0) 
16 October 2002:   Poland –  New Zealand 2:0 (0:0) 
2 April 2003:   Poland –  San Marino 5:0 (2:0) (UEFA Euro 2004 qualifying)
16 November 2005:   Poland –  Estonia 3:1 (1:0)

Matches of the women's national football team of Poland
21 June 1997:  Poland –  Yugoslavia 3:0 (0:0)
12 September 1998:  Poland –  Switzerland 0:1 (0:1)

Polish SuperCup match
22 September 1999: Wisła Kraków - Amica Wronki 0:1 (0:0)
20 July 2008: Wisła Kraków - Legia Warszawa 1:2 (1:1)

KSZO Ostrowiec Świętokrzyski
Miejski Stadion Sportowy "KSZO" w Ostrowcu Swietokrzyskim
Sports venues in Świętokrzyskie Voivodeship